Manuela Lütke (born 8 August 1967) is a German footballer. She played in one match for the Germany women's national football team in 1988.

References

External links
 

1967 births
Living people
German women's footballers
Germany women's international footballers
Place of birth missing (living people)
Women's association footballers not categorized by position